Petre Ivan may refer to:

 Petre Ivan (footballer, born 1927), Romanian international footballer
 Petre Ivan (footballer, born 1946), Romanian international footballer

See also
 Petre